The 1959 Bucknell Bison football team was an American football team that represented Bucknell University during the 1959 NCAA College Division football season. Bucknell finished fourth in the University Division of the Middle Atlantic Conference.

In its second season under head coach Bob Odell, the team compiled a 4–5 record, 3–3 against division opponents. Larry Mathias was the team captain.

Following their defeat of Rutgers, an NCAA University Division team, Bucknell earned a national No. 11 ranking in the UPI Small College Poll. The following week, the Bison lost to unranked Lafayette, and were pushed out of the top 20. Bucknell remained unranked through the end of the season.

The team played its home games at Memorial Stadium on the university campus in Lewisburg, Pennsylvania.

Schedule

References

Bucknell
Bucknell Bison football seasons
Bucknell Bison football